Ivan Medle (10 February 1932 – 4 February 2003) was a Croatian football player.

Club career
Born in Zagreb, he started his career with Metalac, before moving on to Lokomotiva. His next move was to Rijeka, where he is regarded as one of the fastest players of all time. Medle was Rijeka's top scorer during the 1958–59 season, and he scored 34 goals for the club between 1957 and 1962. In 1963 he moved to Austria where he played for Sturm Graz until 1966, when he finished his career.

International career
He had one appearance for the PR Croatia team (against Indonesia) in 1956.

Personal life

Death
Medle died in Vienna on 4 February 2003.

References

1932 births
2003 deaths
Footballers from Zagreb
Association football forwards
Yugoslav footballers
Croatian footballers
Croatia international footballers
NK Lokomotiva Zagreb players
HNK Rijeka players
SK Sturm Graz players
Yugoslav First League players
Yugoslav expatriate footballers
Expatriate footballers in Austria
Yugoslav expatriate sportspeople in Austria